Andrey Grigoryevich Kravchenko (– 18 October 1963) was the commander of multiple tank units of the Red Army throughout World War II who was twice awarded the title Hero of the Soviet Union.

Early life
Kravchenko was born in a farming family in the village of Sulimivtsy near Poltava, Ukraine. He was an ethnic Ukrainian. Kravchenko fought in the Russian Civil War. He was educated at the Poltava infantry Academy (1923) and the Frunze Military Academy. He subsequently served with the infantry and taught at the Saratov Tank Warfare school. From 1939 he was attached to the Volga Military District as chief of staff of the 61st Rifle Division. Kravchenko fought in the Soviet Finnish War as chief of staff of the 173rd Motorized Division. In 1940 Kravchenko was appointed chief of staff of the 16th Tank Division and later the 18th Mechanised Corps.

World War II
Kravchenko commanded the 2nd Tank Corps, 4th Tank Corps, 5th Guards Tank Corps and 6th Guards Tank Army during World War II. He fought in the Battle of Moscow, the Battle of Stalingrad, the Battle of Kursk at the Battle of Prokhorovka, the Battle of the Dnieper, the Korsun-Shevchenkovsky Offensive, the Uman–Botoșani Offensive, the Second Jassy–Kishinev Offensive, the Vienna Offensive and the Bratislava–Brno Offensive. After the German surrender, Kravchenko's 6th Guards Tank Army was transferred to the Far East and fought in the Soviet invasion of Manchuria as part of the Transbaikal Front.

Postwar
Kravchenko graduated from the higher academic courses at the Military Academy of the General Staff in 1949. He subsequently commanded tank forces and was commander of the Far Eastern Military District from 1954. Kravchenko retired from the army in 1955 and served as a deputy in the Supreme Soviet. He died on  October 18, 1963. He was buried in Moscow at the Novodevichy cemetery. A bronze bust to Kravchenko was installed at his former home in Sumy.

References 

1899 births
1963 deaths
Heroes of the Soviet Union
Recipients of the Order of Lenin
Recipients of the Order of the Red Banner
Recipients of the Order of Suvorov, 1st class
Recipients of the Order of Bogdan Khmelnitsky (Soviet Union), 1st class
Recipients of the Order of Suvorov, 2nd class
Recipients of the Order of Kutuzov, 2nd class
Soviet colonel generals
People from Poltava Governorate
Frunze Military Academy alumni
Military Academy of the General Staff of the Armed Forces of the Soviet Union alumni
Soviet military personnel of World War II from Ukraine